Bright Horizon is an old-time radio soap opera in the United States. It was broadcast on CBS August 25, 1941 - July 6, 1945. The program initially had an alternate title, The Story of Michael West.

Format
Bright Horizon was a spinoff of the Big Sister radio program. To help with the transition, Alice Frost, who played Ruth Wayne in the original series, was heard in the first episodes of the spinoff. Michael West, the main character in the new program, was a singer on Big Sister. With the switch to Bright Horizon, he continued singing but also used his law degree "and gradually became more involved in a law career, at one time considering a run for governor."

In 1942, a review of the program in Billboard said, in part:The quality is none too high on Bright Horizon, ... but at least the 15 minutes on the shot caught had enough action to sustain a sort of infantile interest, and the acting level was for the most part surprisingly high.

Bright Horizon was sponsored by Lever Brothers, advertising Swan Soap.

Personnel
Characters in Bright Horizon and the actors and actresses who portrayed them are shown in the table below.

Source: Radio Programs, 1924-1984: A Catalog of More Than 1800 Shows, except as noted.

Others heard on the program were Skip Homeier, Jackie Grimes, Santos Ortega and Chester Stratton.

Announcers were John Harper, Roland Winters, Grace Russell, Paul Luther and Marjorie Anderson. The organist was John Gart. Day Tuttle was the producer. Henry Hull, Charles Powers, Day Tuttle, Ralph Butler and Walter Allison Tibbals were the directors. Writers were James Hart, Elizabeth Hart, John M. Young, Ted Maxwell, Stuart Hawkins and Kathleen Norris.

Sequel
After Bright Horizon'''s last broadcast, "the program was extended for a few months, with the name changed to A Woman's Life''."

See also
 
List of radio soap operas

References 

1941 radio programme debuts
1945 radio dramas
1945 radio programme endings
CBS Radio programs
American radio soap operas